The  is the upcoming ninth annual professional wrestling single-elimination tournament promoted by World Wonder Ring Stardom. The event will take place between March 26 and April 15, 2023.

Storylines
The show will feature professional wrestling matches with scripted storylines, where wrestlers portray villains, heroes, or less distinguishable characters in the scripted events that built tension and culminate in a wrestling match or series of matches. The matches can be won by pinfall, submission or elimination over the top rope. A time-limit draw or a double elimination means a loss for each competitor.

Participants
The tournament will be the largest to its date, with 36 competitors entering it, including the champions. Two of the competitors are yet to be revealed.

*Noted underneath are the champions who held their titles at the time of the tournament.
{| class="wikitable sortable" align="left center" 
|-
!Wrestler
!Unit
!Notes
|-
|Ami Sourei
|God's Eye
|Future of Stardom Champion
|-
|AZM
|Queen's Quest
|High Speed Champion
|-
|Giulia
|Donna Del Mondo
|World of Stardom Champion
|-
|Hanan
|Stars
|
|-
|Haruka Umesaki
|Oedo Tai
|Freelancer
|-
|Hazuki
|Stars
|
|-
|Himeka
|Donna Del Mondo
|
|-
|Hina
|Queen's Quest
|
|-
|Koguma
|Stars
|
|-
|Lady C
|Queen's Quest
|
|-
|Mai Sakurai
|Donna Del Mondo
|
|-
|Maika
|Donna Del Mondo
|
|-
|Mariah May
|Club Venus
|
|-
|Mayu Iwatani
|Stars
|
|-
|Mina Shirakawa
|Cosmic Angels/Club Venus
|
|-
|Mirai
|God's Eye
|
|-
|Miyu Amasaki
|Queen's Quest
|
|-
|Momo Kohgo
|Stars
|
|-
|Momo Watanabe
|Oedo Tai
|
|-
|Nanae Takahashi
|Neo Stardom Army
|Goddess of Stardom Champion
|-
|Natsuko Tora
|Oedo Tai
|
|-
|Natsupoi
|Cosmic Angels
|
|-
|Rina
|Oedo Tai
|
|-
|Ruaka
|Oedo Tai
|
|-
|Saki Kashima
|Oedo Tai
|
|-
|Saya Iida
|Stars
|
|-
|Saya Kamitani
|Queen's Quest
|Wonder of Stardom Champion
|-
|Starlight Kid
|Oedo Tai
|
|-
|Syuri
|God's Eye
|
|-
|Tam Nakano
|Cosmic Angels
|
|-
|Thekla
|Donna Del Mondo
|
|-
|Tomoka Inaba
|God's Eye
|Freelancer
|-
|Utami Hayashishita
|Queen's Quest
|
|-
|Yuna Mizumori
|Neo Stardom Army
|Freelancer
|-
|X
|
|
|-
|X
|
|

Brackets

Notes

References

External links
Page Stardom World

2023 in professional wrestling
Women's professional wrestling shows
World Wonder Ring Stardom shows
World Wonder Ring Stardom